Iochroma grandiflorum  is an Iochroma species found in Ecuador. It was first described in 1845

References

External links

grandiflorum